Maricela Monserrate Gómez (born November 23, 1976) is an Ecuadorian actress, television presenter, and psychologist.

Biography
Maricela Gómez was born in Guayaquil on November 23, 1976. She began her acting career in the early 1990s as a member of the company of the Teatro Bambalinas, led by actor Raúl Varela. She made her television debut in 1993 as an extra in the telenovela , produced by Ecuavisa.

She obtained greater public recognition in 1999, when she starred in the TC Televisión telenovela .

In 2003, she appeared in the telenovela , playing an antagonist to the leads played by Sharon la Hechicera and Bernie Paz. The following year, she was part of the cast of the Ecuavisa telenovela .

In 2005, she made her debut as a television presenter, serving as a panelist for the business show Sharon y los especialistas, again sharing the screen with Sharon la Hechicera. In 2006, she starred in the telenovela , and in the same year she also starred in the comedy Kliffor alongside . In 2007, she starred as María in the successful youth series .

At the end of that year, she starred in the comedy Corazón contento.

In 2009, she joined the ranks of RTS as host of the morning show El Club de la Mañana, along with Marcelo Cornejo, María Gracia Manzano, and Sandra Pareja. Gómez remained with the show until its cancellation in early 2018.

In 2019, she returned to acting after 10 years, joining the biographical telenovela  in its second season. Her character, Wilma Aguilar, is the prosecutor investigating the death of the singer Sharon.

In 2021, she made a special appearance on the TC Televisión series , in which she played María Elena.

Personal life
Gómez has three daughters from her first marriage, to actor Patricio Moreno.

She married fellow actor Darío León in October 2006. They divorced in 2009, but continued their relationship until 2011.

She has been in a romantic relationship with psychologist Gerardo Panchana since 2014.

She was diagnosed with fibromyalgia in 2011, for which she received treatments to calm the pain and recover. After her father's death due to stomach cancer, the actress completely changed her eating habits, in addition to avoiding high impact exercise routines and taking care of her skin with regard to makeup.

In 2018, Gómez graduated as a psychologist from the University of Guayaquil, also receiving the school's Contenta Award. As of 2020, she had largely left acting and was offering online therapy sessions during the COVID-19 pandemic.

Filmography

TV series and telenovelas
  (1993) ... extra
  (1995)
  (1995) ... Sonia
  (1997)
  (1999–2002) ... Dr. Rosario Tama
  (2003) ... Juana
  (2004) ... Pilar
  (2005–2006) ... Norma de Altamirano
 Kliffor (2006)
  (2007) ... María
 El Gabinete (2008)
 Corazón contento (2008–2009)
  (2019) ... Fiscal Wilma Aguilar
  (2021) ... Maria Elena

TV programs
 Sharon y los especialistas (2005) ... presenter
 El Club de la Mañana (2009–2018) ... presenter

References

External links
 

1976 births
Ecuadorian telenovela actresses
Ecuadorian television presenters
Ecuadorian women television presenters
Living people
People from Guayaquil
University of Guayaquil alumni
21st-century Ecuadorian women